Mikunoyoasobi (stylized in all caps) is the second extended play (EP) by Japanese Vocaloid producer and songwriter Ayase. It was surprisingly physically released on January 6, 2021, the same date as Yoasobi's debut EP The Book, through Sony Music Entertainment Japan exclusively to Tower Records Japan store.

The EP contains cover version of seven tracks from The Book recorded by Vocaloid software voicebank Hatsune Miku, including "Yoru ni Kakeru", which originally appears on the CD version of Ayase's debut EP Ghost City Tokyo. It entered Oricon Albums Chart at number 15, and Billboard Japan Hot Albums at number 18, selling over 3,700 copies in its first week.

Track listing

Notes
 All tracks are noted as

Charts

Certifications and sales

Release history

References

2021 EPs
Creative works using vocaloids
Japanese-language EPs
Sony Music Entertainment Japan EPs